Kenneth Andersen (born 23 October 1967) is a Danish football manager. He was most recently the manager of Danish Superliga club FC Midtjylland.

Career
Andersen was the manager of various FC Midtjylland youth teams for 13 years before succeeding Jess Thorup in October 2018 as head coach of the club. From 2001 to 2004 he managed the lower league club Billund iF. On 19 August 2019 he resigned as manager of FC Midtjylland. The club also announced, that Andersen would continue at the club, working with the academy.

Honours

Manager

FC Midtjylland:

 Danish Cup:  2018–19

References

External links
FC Midtjylland profile

1967 births
Living people
People from Svendborg Municipality
Danish football managers
FC Midtjylland managers
Sportspeople from the Region of Southern Denmark